Ntobroso is a community in the Atwima Mponua district in Ashanti region of Ghana.

References 

Villages in Ghana